Bozeman Yellowstone International Airport  (Gallatin Field) is located in Belgrade, Montana, United States, eight miles (13 km) northwest of Bozeman. Owned by the Gallatin Airport Authority, it has been Montana's busiest airport since 2013.

The National Plan of Integrated Airport Systems for 2011–2015 categorized it as a primary commercial service facility (more than 10,000 enplanements per year). Federal Aviation Administration records show that the airport had 442,788 passenger boardings (enplanements) in calendar year 2013, 434,038 in 2012 and 397,870 in 2011.

History
In 2011, a terminal expansion designed by Prugh & Lenon Architects opened, adding three gates and more retail concessions.  The firm designed expansions and renovations made in 1995 and 1997.

Gallatin Field was renamed Bozeman Yellowstone International Airport in late 2011 to associate it with Yellowstone National Park. International flights have been allowed since 2012, after a U.S. Customs and Border Protection facility opened on July 1. The project was funded in cooperation with Signature Flight Support and the Yellowstone Club. In 2013, BZN surpassed Billings Logan as the busiest airport in Montana for passenger service with 879,221 passengers from June 2012 to May 2013.

The airport has had a massive expansion of service in 2020 and 2021 to a record 31 nonstop destinations as airlines entered the market or added new routes to serve increased leisure demand. Allegiant Air added nonstop service from three cities; Alaska Airlines added two new routes; startup airline Avelo Airlines began service to one destination; and Southwest Airlines, the largest airline without service to any city in Montana, entered Montana for the first time with two destinations from Bozeman, later adding several more. Several of the markets added had never been commercially served from Bozeman before, including Washington, D.C. (Dulles) and Nashville.

Facilities

It has four runways: 12/30 is  asphalt; 3/21 is  asphalt; 11/29 is  asphalt; and 11G/29G is  turf.

In 2017 the airport had 76,223 aircraft operations, an average of 209 per day. General aviation accounted for 73% of operations. Air carrier operations accounted for 15%, air taxi operations accounted for 12% and military operations accounted for <1%. At that time,  there were 359 aircraft based at BZN, 260 single engine, 24 multi-engine, 41 jets, 23 helicopters and 11 gliders.

Airlines and destinations

Passenger

Cargo
 Corporate Air (operating on behalf of FedEx Feeder and United States Postal Service)
 Alpine Air Express (operating on behalf of UPS Airlines and United States Postal Service)

Statistics

Airport traffic

Top destinations

Airline market share

See also
 List of airports in Montana

References

External links
 
 

Airports in Montana
Buildings and structures in Gallatin County, Montana
Transportation in Gallatin County, Montana